Raymond Thomas Book (February 14, 1925 – May 6, 2018) was a Republican member of the Pennsylvania House of Representatives.

References

1925 births
2018 deaths
Republican Party members of the Pennsylvania House of Representatives
Politicians from Pittsburgh